The McHenry Library is the arts, humanities, and social sciences library of the University of California, Santa Cruz. It was named after the founding chancellor of the university, Dean E. McHenry. The building, designed by architect John Carl Warnecke, was completed in 1968 and features a minimalist design intended to blend into its forest surroundings, with floor-to-ceiling glass set in coarse, granite-like concrete and exposed vertical columns suggestive of tree trunks. The building is designed around a four-story atrium surrounded entirely by glass walls. Over the last ten years the library has undergone seismic retrofit and renovations, amounting in $100 million in improvements. In fall of 2011 it fully reopened with a new café, increased study space, and special exhibit room exclusively for the Grateful Dead archives. The Global Village Café, which is located in the new wing of the library and offers smoothies, sandwiches, salads, and a full coffee bar.

The McHenry Library is home to the archives of the anthropologist Gregory Bateson, the rock band, The Grateful Dead, the science fiction author, Robert Heinlein, and the architectural photographer Morley Baer. The exhibit opened to the public on June 29, 2012.

References

External links
 Photographs and architectural drawings of McHenry Library from the UC Santa Cruz Library's Digital Collections

Library buildings completed in 1968
University of California, Santa Cruz
University and college academic libraries in the United States
Libraries in California
McHenry Library, UCSC
University of California, Santa Cruz buildings and structures